Shelley Ann Grogan (born 1967) is an American lawyer and judge, currently serving on the Wisconsin Court of Appeals in the Waukesha-based District II court.  She previously served as a municipal judge in Muskego, Wisconsin.

Biography
Grogan received her bachelor's degree from Marquette University in 1989, and went directly into Marquette University Law School, where she earned her J.D. in 1992.  

Early in her legal career, she worked as a clerk to three judges of the Wisconsin Court of Appeals, Ted Wedemeyer, Ralph Adam Fine, and Rebecca Bradley.  When Judge Bradley was appointed to the Wisconsin Supreme Court in 2015, Grogan went with her as a judicial assistant.  

A resident of Muskego for 25 years, she was appointed municipal judge in 2020.  Less than a year later, she announced her candidacy for Wisconsin Court of Appeals.  She defeated incumbent judge Jeffrey O. Davis in the April 2021 election with 55% of the vote.

In addition to her judicial career, Grogan has worked as an attorney in civil litigation, and is an adjunct professor at Marquette University Law School.

Personal life
Judge Grogan married attorney Frederick J. "Rick" Smith in 1992. They had three children together before his death in 2009.

Electoral history

Wisconsin Court of Appeals (2021)

| colspan="6" style="text-align:center;background-color: #e9e9e9;"| General Election, April 6, 2021

References

External links
 
 Campaign website (Archived March 27, 2021)

Date of birth unknown
1967 births
Living people
Marquette University alumni
Marquette University Law School alumni
Wisconsin Court of Appeals judges
21st-century American judges